Stephen M. Thompson Sr. (born December 2, 1968) is an American college basketball coach and former professional player who is an assistant coach at Oregon State University.

Born in Los Angeles, Thompson attended Crenshaw High School and then Syracuse University, where he was named the Big East's Scholar Athlete of the Year. He played briefly in the NBA during the 1991-92 season for the Sacramento Kings (23 games) and Orlando Magic (one game).

He was selected to the Syracuse Men's Basketball All-Century Team in 2000.

Thompson was appointed head coach of the California State University, Los Angeles men's basketball team for the 2005-06 season after working as an assistant since 2002.

He joined the coaching staff of the Oregon State University men's basketball program in 2014 as an assistant coach.  In 2022, Thompson became the new assistant Athletic Director- Player Development.

Notes

External links
NBA statistics @ basketballreference.com
OrangeHoops Profile on Stephen Thompson

1968 births
Living people
21st-century African-American people
African-American basketball players
American men's basketball coaches
American men's basketball players
Basketball coaches from California
Basketball players from Los Angeles
Cal State Los Angeles Golden Eagles men's basketball coaches
Crenshaw High School alumni
Grand Rapids Mackers players
La Crosse Catbirds players
McDonald's High School All-Americans
Oklahoma City Cavalry players
Oregon State Beavers men's basketball coaches
Orlando Magic players
Parade High School All-Americans (boys' basketball)
Rapid City Thrillers players
Rochester Renegade players
Sacramento Kings players
San Diego Wildfire players
Shooting guards
Syracuse Orange men's basketball players
Undrafted National Basketball Association players
Universiade gold medalists for the United States
Universiade medalists in basketball
20th-century African-American sportspeople